The 2005 Armenian Premier League season was the fourteenth since its establishment, and started on 12 April 2005. The last matches were played on 6 November 2005. FC Pyunik were the defending champions.

Participating teams

Lernayin Artsakh FC from Yerevan are promoted.
FC Kotayk from Abovyan changed their name to Esteghlal-Kotayk.

Regular season

League table

Results

Championship round

Championship round league table
The qualified teams only keep their head-to-head results to participate in the Championship stage, resulting in the following table.

Final classification

Results

Relegation round

Relegation round league table
The qualified teams kept their complete results before entering the stage. The team finishing in 7th position remained in the Premier League, the 8th ranked team played the promotion/relegation play-off, while the 9th team was relegated.

Results 

|}

Relegation/Promotion play-off

See also
 2005 Armenian First League
 2005 Armenian Cup

External links
 RSSSF: Armenia 2005 - Premier League

Armenian Premier League seasons
1
Armenia
Armenia